Saint Vincent and the Grenadines have no regular military force; the paramilitary Special Service Unit and the Coast Guard are both under the command of the Royal Saint Vincent and the Grenadines Police Force. As of 2010, there are an estimated 31,489 males age 16-49 available for military service, and an estimated 28,518 males age 16–49, fit for military service. Each year, approximately 1169 males and 1224 females reach military age, as estimated in 2010.

The Royal Saint Vincent and the Grenadines Police Force receives training from the USSOUTHCOM. The United States Armed Forces consider Saint Vincent and the Grenadines as a partner nation in the Caribbean, along with St. Lucia.

References

External links
Homepage of the Royal Saint Vincent and the Grenadines Police Force
Royal Saint Vincent and the Grenadines Police Force webpage at Interpol

 
Saint Vincent and the Grenadines